EVT may refer to:

 Endovascular thrombectomy, a therapy for ischemic strokes or other ischemia
 Engineering validation test, testing of prototypes for viability
 Estill Voice Training, a program for developing vocal skills
 EVT Limited, formerly Event Hospitality and Entertainment, an Australian company
 Expectancy-value theory, in communications
 Expectancy violations theory, in communications
 Extreme value theorem, in calculus
 Extreme value theory, in statistics
 Electrically variable transmission, a type of vehicle transmission